Herman, Count van den Bergh (2 August 1558 in Huis Bergh, 's-Heerenberg, Gelderland – 12 August 1611 in Spa) was a Dutch soldier in the Eighty Years' War, knight of the Order of the Golden Fleece and stadtholder of Spanish Guelders.

Life
In 1584 he, his brothers Frederik and Hendrik and their father Willem IV van den Bergh joined the Spanish side in the War, though Herman was still active in States service as a captain and garrison commander active  's Heerenberg and Doetinchem. Whilst on the Spanish side Herman was more active in the 1591 Siege of Deventer, which surrendered to Maurice of Nassau after ten days. Two years later, in 1593, Herman was promoted to stadhouder of Spanish Guelders.

References

External links
Painting of Herman van den Bergh on his deathbed in Spa

1558 births
1611 deaths
People from Montferland
Dutch people of the Eighty Years' War (Spanish Empire)
Dutch people of the Eighty Years' War (United Provinces)
Dutch stadtholders